The Return of the Great Gildersleeves is the fifth Danger Danger album and the third to feature singer Paul Laine.

Track listing
All songs written by B.Ravel/S.West/P.Laine

 "Grind" - 5:27
 "When She's Good She's Good (When She's Bad She's Better)" - 5:17
 "Six Million Dollar Man" - 4:07
 "She's Gone" - 5:27
 "Dead Drunk & Wasted" - 5:23
 "Dead Dog" - 6:41
 "I Do" - 4:30
 "My Secret" - 3:42
 "Cherry Cherry" - 4:26
 "Get in the Ring" - 3:16
 "Walk It Like Ya Talk It" - 3:45

Personnel

Band
Paul Laine - lead vocals, keyboards, rhythm guitar
Bruno Ravel - lead and rhythm guitars, backing vocals, keyboards, bass
Steve West - drums, percussion

Special guest appearances by
Andy Timmons - lead guitar, backing vocals
Tony Bruno - lead guitar, keyboards
Lance Quinn - keyboards

References

2000 albums
Danger Danger albums